Lycaenops ("wolf-face") is a genus of carnivorous therapsids. It lived during the Middle Permian to the early Late Permian, about 260 mya, in what is now South Africa.

Description

Like the modern-day wolves from which it takes its name, Lycaenops had a long and slender skull, with a set of dog-like fangs set into both its upper and lower jaws. These pointed canine teeth were ideal for the use of stabbing and/or tearing at the flesh of any large prey that it came upon. Lycaenops most likely hunted small vertebrates such as reptiles and dicynodonts.

Lycaenops walked and ran with its long legs held close to its body. This is a feature found in mammals, but not in more primitive amniotes, early reptiles, and synapsids such as pelycosaurs, whose legs are positioned to the sides of their bodies. The ability to move like a mammal would have given Lycaenops an advantage over other land vertebrates, since it would have been able to outrun them.

Species

The type species Lycaenops ornatus was named by South African paleontologist Robert Broom in 1925. 

Several other species have also been referred to the genus, including L. angusticeps, which was originally named Scymnognathus angusticeps. It is currently considered a valid taxon.

Several other specimens have been referred to as Lycaenops, but are no longer included within this genus. This includes:

 L. kingwilli, which was originally named Tigricephalus kingwilli, is now placed in the genus Aelurognathus. 
 L. tenuirostris, which was originally named Tangagorgon tenuirostris and is now in the genus Cyonosaurus. 
 Two additional species, L. microdon and L. sollasi, were added to Lycaenops after having been classified as species of Aelurognathus. The species L. minor is now considered a synonym of L. sollasi.

Classification 

Below is a cladogram from the phylogenetic analysis of Gebauer (2007):

See also

 Evolution of mammals
 List of therapsids
 Gorgonops

References

Gorgonopsia
Prehistoric therapsid genera
Guadalupian synapsids of Africa
Fossil taxa described in 1925
Lopingian synapsids of Africa
Taxa named by Robert Broom
Guadalupian genus first appearances
Capitanian genera
Wuchiapingian genera
Lopingian genus extinctions